"Voodoo Ray" is the debut single by Gerald Simpson, recording under the name A Guy Called Gerald. The single was released in the UK in 1988 on the 7" and 12" vinyl formats, on the Rham! label. It was released in the United States in 1989 by Warlock Records.

The single spent 18 weeks on the UK Singles Chart eventually reaching number 12, and was awarded best-selling independent single of 1989 by Music Week and the British Phonographic Industry. The track became a popular acid house anthem associated with Manchester club The Haçienda.

Recording
"Voodoo Ray" began as a home demo recorded by Simpson, with the beat and baseline already sketched out. It was then re-recorded along with  the surrounding EP over two days in June 1988 at Moonraker Studios in Manchester. The session featured production assistance from the duo of Aniff Akinola and Colin Thorpe (together credited as Chapter), as well as engineer Lee Monteverde. Simpson explained: I was trying to keep it quiet from the dudes in 808 State, because I was still working with them but wanted to do my own thing. It was fun just slipping out of their basement and taking the drum machine. They'd be like, 'Where are you going?' I'd say, 'Oh, I'm just going home to do some programming,' then nip off to another studio.

The track contains samples of comedians Peter Cook and Dudley Moore, taken from the first Derek and Clive LP, Derek and Clive (Live), specifically the "Bo Duddley" sketch. "Voodoo Ray" combines a sample of Cook delivering the phrase "voodoo rage", truncated due to the recording equipment's lack of memory, and also Moore forcefully delivering the word "later!". Gerald explained: "I was trying to get a tribal sound and found this sample saying 'Voodoo rage'. That was originally the title but the old sampler I was using didn't have that much memory. I just about had enough for 'voodoo ra…', so that's what it became."

The vocal was sung by Nicola Collier, who had worked on other tracks with Simpson, with the vocal melody suggested by Thorpe and later chopped up by Simpson using an Akai S-950 sampler.

Release
Rham! initially pressed up 500 copies of the record and it sold out in a day. It received support from local DJs and eventually became an anthem at Manchester club The Haçienda.

A version of the track also appeared on A Guy Called Gerald's 1988 album Hot Lemonade, and a re-recorded version called "Voodoo Ray Americas" appeared on A Guy Called Gerald's 1990 album Automanikk, which was released by Columbia and CBS Records.

Critical reception
Bill Coleman from Billboard commented, "Underground smash in the U.K. last summer utilizes the most intriguing elements of acid house and places them in a thoroughly engrossing dance setting. Yearning female chant and irresistible instrumental hook has the potential to make a huge impression with club and alternative programmers. A killer—don't miss."

Impact and legacy
British clubbing magazine Mixmag ranked "Voodoo Ray" number 46 in its 100 Greatest Dance Singles of All Time list in 1996, commenting, "A lovely, wibbly-wobbly thing, Voodoo Ray is pretty much the first British acid house record, and sounds like it was recorded by banging on metal pipes. Which is nice."

Same year British drum and bass DJ and producer Fabio chose it as one of his favourites, adding, "Voodoo Ray is an early drum & bass track because of the way it was layered: the sounds, the working of it. It's laid back but at the same time so danceable. We were really into imports at the time and he was the first English guy we got interested in. He kick-started the whole British scene so it's a very important track. He's so underrated." Also another English DJ, Tall Paul picked the song as one of his Top 10 tracks in 1996, saying, "This was so different at the time. A massive groundbreaker — the girl, the chant and the way she sings."

In 2019, journalist Matt Anniss wrote that "Voodoo Ray" "may now be one of the most recognizable House records ever made, but the track has lost none of its charm or power." Anniss also opined that the four-track EP "has held up remarkably well," calling the additional tracks "similarly weighty, inspired and off kilter."

Rolling Stone ranked it number 55 in their list of 200 Greatest Dance Songs of All Time in 2022.

Track listing
 7" version
"Voodoo Ray (Radio Mix)" – 4:18
"Arcade Fantasy" – 4:43 

 12" and CD version
"Voodoo Ray" – 4:28
"Escape" – 5:16
"Rhapsody in Acid" – 5:23
"Blow Your House Down" – 5:03

Charts

In popular culture
In 1995, Simpson re-modelled the original samples to create a new track, "Voodoo Rage", for his Black Secret Technology album.

The song is featured on the soundtrack of the 2002 film 24 Hour Party People (directed by Michael Winterbottom) that tells the story of Factory Records and the early Madchester scene. The song is also featured in the radio station SF-UR in the 2004 game Grand Theft Auto: San Andreas. The song appears in filmmaker Cheryl Dunye's She Don't Fade (1991).

A Steelpan cover version was also used in artist Jeremy Deller's work English Magic, which was displayed at the Venice Biennale in 2013.

Personnel
A Guy Called Gerald - writer, producer
Chapter (Aniff Akinola and Colin Thorpe) - co-producer
Lee Monteverde - engineer
JA - mastering
Nicola Collier - vocals

References

1988 songs
1988 debut singles
Acid house songs
Warlock Records singles
British house music songs